Greg Robert Bargar (born January 27, 1959) is a former Major League Baseball pitcher.

External links

1959 births
Living people
American expatriate baseball players in Canada
Baseball players from Inglewood, California
Denver Bears players
Indianapolis Indians players
Louisville Redbirds players
Major League Baseball pitchers
Memphis Chicks players
Montreal Expos players
St. Louis Cardinals players
Wichita Aeros players
Arizona Wildcats baseball players